Our Lady of Victories Basilica is a Catholic church located in the Melbourne suburb of Camberwell. Romanesque in style, it was designed by architect Augustus Andrew Fritsch (1866 – 1933) and was completed in 1918. It is one of five churches in Australia with minor basilica status. The current parish priest is Rev. Brendan Reed.

Our Lady of Victories occupies an imposing site in Burke Road and, in a city where most churches of the era are built in the Gothic Revival style, has a distinctive copper clad dome completed with a golden statue of the Virgin Mary.

References

External links 

Basilica churches in Australia
Roman Catholic churches in Victoria (Australia)
Roman Catholic churches in Melbourne
Roman Catholic churches completed in 1918
20th-century Roman Catholic church buildings in Australia
1918 establishments in Australia
Buildings and structures in the City of Boroondara